= Gameplayers =

1986 novel by Stephen Bowkett

Gameplayers is a novel by Stephen Bowkett published in 1986.

== Plot summary ==
Gameplayers is a novel in which a youth escapes into role-playing games from his difficult home life.

== Reception ==
Dave Langford reviewed Gameplayers for White Dwarf #85, and stated that "It's all rather well done, though there's a faintly moralizing note of Fantasy Games May Damage Your Mental Health..."

== Reviews ==
- Review by Andy Sawyer (1989) in Paperback Inferno, #76
